The 1984 Nabisco Dinah Shore was a women's professional golf tournament, held April 5–8 at Mission Hills Country Club in Rancho Mirage, California. This was the thirteenth edition of the ANA Inspiration, and the second as a major championship. With a purse of $400,000 and a winner's share of $55,000, this was the richest event in women's golf in 1984.

Juli Inkster, 23, won the first of her seven major titles in a sudden-death playoff over Pat Bradley, with a par on the first extra hole. It was Inkster's second win on tour; she turned professional eight months earlier and won the Safeco Classic near Seattle in September 1983.

Defending champion Amy Alcott finished at even par 288, eight strokes back in a tie for tenth.

Final leaderboard
Sunday, April 8, 1984

Source:

Playoff

The sudden-death playoff began and ended on the first extra hole, the par 4 fifteenth.
Source:

References

External links
Golf Observer leaderboard

Chevron Championship
Golf in California
Nabisco Dinah Shore
Nabisco Dinah Shore
Nabisco Dinah Shore
Nabisco Dinah Shore
Women's sports in California